Sir Christopher George Rhodes, 3rd Baronet (30 April 1914 – 22 June 1964) was an English film and television actor. He was awarded the Croix de Guerre and the United States Legion of Merit for his Second World War service.

Early life
Rhodes was born in Alverstone, Isle of Wight, the only son of Sir John Rhodes, 2nd Baronet, and attended Eton College and Magdalen College, Oxford. During the Second World War, he served with the Essex Regiment, reaching the rank of lieutenant-colonel.

Career
Rhodes began his acting career after the war. His television appearances include The Quatermass Experiment, Danger Man, Dixon of Dock Green and The Saint.

Personal life
Rhodes was married twice, first to Mary Kesteven in 1936, whom he divorced in 1942, and then to Mary Florence Wardleworth in 1943, who bore him two sons and a daughter. He succeeded to his father's baronetcy in 1955.

Death
Rhodes died at his home in Blakeney, Norfolk, on 22 June 1964, aged 50.

Selected filmography

 Moulin Rouge (1952) (uncredited)
 Laughing Anne (1953) as Escort No. 1
 Betrayed (1954) as Chris
 Gravelhanger (1954)
 The Colditz Story (1955) as 'Mac' McGill
 The Feminine Touch (1956) as Dr Ted Russell
 Tiger in the Smoke (1956) as Chief Inspector Luke
 Ill Met by Moonlight (1957) as General Bräuer (uncredited)
 The Naked Earth (1958) as Al
 Dunkirk (1958) as Sergeant on the beaches
 Wonderful Things! (1958) as Codger
 Operation Amsterdam (1959) as Alex
 The Lady Is a Square (1959) as Greenslade
 Tiger Bay (1959) as Inspector Bridges
 John Paul Jones (1959) as Ringleader
 Shake Hands with the Devil (1959) as Colonel Smithson
 A Terrible Beauty (1960) as Tim Malone
 Gorgo (1961) as McCartin
 The Guns of Navarone (1961) as German Gunnery Officer
 El Cid (1961) as Don Martín
 The Piper Pune (1962) as Captain
 Lancelot and Guinevere (1963) as Ulfus, aka Sword of Lancelot (USA)
 The Cracksman (1963) as Mr. King
 Becket (1964) as Baron (final film role)

References

External links
 

1914 births
1964 deaths
English male film actors
English male television actors
Baronets in the Baronetage of the United Kingdom
Alumni of Magdalen College, Oxford
People educated at Eton College
Essex Regiment officers
British Army personnel of World War II
Foreign recipients of the Legion of Merit
Recipients of the Croix de Guerre 1939–1945 (France)
Place of birth missing
20th-century English male actors
Actors from the Isle of Wight
People from Blakeney, Norfolk
Military personnel from the Isle of Wight